The Port St. Charles marina is a luxury marina development situated on the western coast of Barbados.  Found within the parish of Saint Peter, the marina is in Heywoods and is in close proximity to Speightstown.  The Port St. Charles marina contains an admeasurement of sum 1549 square metres, and is made up exclusive villas, condos and apartments, and a small inland lagoon area (with a depth of 14 feet at low tide) and adorned with facilities for residents to berth their yachts close to their vacation homes. These berths range from 30 ft to 110 ft in length. Water, electricity, telephone and television connection are available at all 50 ft to 110 ft berths and some of the smaller berths. In addition, there are six mega-yacht berths located on the offshore breakwater. The offshore breakwater was designed by Canada-based HCCL.

The marina is host to a branch of the Coastguard, Police, Immigration and Customs facilities operating on the offshore breakwater. As such, it is one of two officially designated sea-based ports of entry in Barbados—the Deep Water Harbour in the capital city of Bridgetown being the other.  Also found in the development are a "heliport" to transport guests to the Grantley Adams International Airport or the Bridgetown Heliport, a health spa, and just off the coast of the Marina lies the Tom Snooch Reef.

The inner lagoon of Port St. Charles is restricted to residents or persons staying at the marina development.

Properties at the Port St. Charles Marina are managed by Port St. Charles Development Ltd.

On the outermost portion of the breakwater is a Heliport.

See also
Port of Bridgetown

References

External links

Saint Peter, Barbados
Ports and harbours of Barbados
Marinas in Barbados